Ruth Inge Hardison (February 3, 1914 – March 23, 2016) was an American sculptor, artist, and photographer, known particularly for her 1960s busts (or sculpted portraits) entitled "Negro Giants in History". Her 1983 collection called "Our Folks", which features sculpted portraits of everyday people, is also of note. Hardison's artistic productions largely surround historical black portraiture, and she is especially interested in creatively representing the unspoken voices of the African American past. She was the only female in the Black Academy of Arts and Letters (BAAL), a group that encourages awareness of black artistic accomplishments, when this organization was founded in 1969.

Early life 
She was born in Portsmouth, Virginia in 1914.   Her family later moved to Brooklyn, New York. Before completing her education, Hardison acted in the Broadway Productions of George Abbott's "Sweet River" and "Country Wife", opposite Ruth Gordon. During her brief career in the theater, she began sculpting as a hobby. When she took part in the year long "What a Life" production, she created a sculpture of its cast, which was later displayed at the Mansfield Theatre. As a young woman, she studied Music and Creative Writing at Vassar College. She also studied at the Art Students League of New York and Tennessee State University.

Artistic works 

Hardison's works largely begin as clay, wax, or plaster molds, and are later cast into cast stone or bronze.
Hardison began "Negro Giants in History" (a series of cast iron busts) in 1963. Her first bust in that series was of Harriet Tubman, which measured eight inches in height; she has also created busts of W. E. B. Du Bois, Paul Robeson, George Washington Carver, Frederick Douglass, Rev. Dr. Martin Luther King, Sojourner Truth, and Mary McCleod Bethune, among others.  Her bronze Douglass bust, for example, was unveiled at Princeton's Firestone Library in 1983. Other public works include a 7-foot abstract figure called "Jubilee" which stands on the campus of Medgar Evers College in Brooklyn, a series of 18 children on an outdoor wall of I.S.74 in Hunts Point in the Bronx, and a five-foot mother and child given to Mount Sinai Hospital in 1957 to express her gratitude for their help in delivering her only child, Yolande, in 1954.  She also created a series of Ingenious Americans, little known black inventors and other notables commissioned and sold by Old Taylor Whiskey in the late 1960s. The series of nine busts included Benjamin Banneker, Charles Richard Drew, Matthew Henson, Frederick McKinley Jones, Lewis Latimer, Garrett Morgan, Norbert Rillieux, Dr. Daniel Hale Williams and Granville Woods.

At auction, her sculptures have earned more than $1300 apiece.  In 1990 New York's Governor Mario Cuomo presented Hardison's 1990 two-foot sculpture of Sojourner Truth to Nelson Mandela on behalf of the people of New York State. Reflecting on her work, Hardison once said: 'During my long life I have enjoyed using different ways to distill the essences of my experiences so as to share for the good they might do in the lives of others.'

Further reading 
"Black Women in America An Historical Encyclopedia", Volumes 1 and 2, edited by Darlene Clark Hine, 1993, Carlson Publishing Inc., Brooklyn, New York, 
"A History of African-American Artist from 1792 to present" by Romare Bearden & Harry Henderson, 1993, Romare Bearden & Harry Henderson, Pantheon Books, NY, 
"Gumbo Ya Ya: Anthology of Contemporary African-American Women Artists" edited by Sylvia Moore, 1995, Midmarch Arts Press, New York, ISBN 1877675075

References

External links

Howard Thompson visits artist Inge Hardison (YouTube video)
Inge Hardison at 100: A Century of Expression in Life and in Art, by Alice Bernstein
 Sculptor Inge Hardison Who Paid Tribute to African-American Legends, has died 
 Why We Should Remember Inge Hardison 
 Obituary - New York Times

1914 births
2016 deaths
Art Students League of New York alumni
American centenarians
African-American centenarians
African-American sculptors
African-American women artists
Vassar College alumni
Tennessee State University alumni
People from Portsmouth, Virginia
Sculptors from New York (state)
Women centenarians
20th-century African-American people
21st-century African-American people
20th-century African-American women
21st-century African-American women